This is a list of golf courses designed by Robert Trent Jones. Robert Trent Jones, Sr. (1906–2000) was an English–American golf course architect who designed or re-designed over 500 golf courses. Listed below is a non-exhaustive selection of golf courses that are original designs by Jones, as well as re-designs of existing courses. The year next to each denotes the year the course opened for play.

List of courses
Duquesa Golf Club, Duquesa, Malaga, Spain
El Caballero Country Club, Tarzana, Los Angeles, 1957
, Grez-Doiceau, 1965
Valencia Country Club, Valencia, California, 1965 
Club El Rincón de Cajicá, Bogotá, Colombia, Colombia, 1963

Original designs

Clube de Golfe de Brasília, Brasília, Brazil, 1960
Adare Golf Club, Limerick, Ireland, 1995
Amsterdam Municipal Golf Course, Amsterdam (city), New York, 1938
Alpine Bay Golf Club, Alpine Bay, AL, 1972
Augusta National Golf Club (11th and 16th holes), Augusta, Georgia, 1947, 1950
Baltusrol Golf Club Lower Course, Springfield, New Jersey, 1952
Bellerive Country Club, Town and Country, Missouri, 1960
Broadmoor Golf Club West Course (7th–14th holes), Colorado Springs, Colorado, 1964
Cacapon Resort State Park, Berkeley Springs, West Virginia
Centre Hills Country Club, State College, PA, 1965
Congressional Country Club Blue Course, Bethesda, Maryland, 1959, 1964
Country Club of North Carolina Cardinal Course, Pinehurst, North Carolina, 1981
Country Club of North Carolina Dogwood Course, Pinehurst, North Carolina, 1980
Crag Burn Golf Club, East Aurora, New York, 1971 
Durand Eastman Golf Club, Irondequoit, New York, 1933 
El Bosque Golf Club, Valencia, Spain, 1975 
Fairview Country Club, Greenwich, Connecticut, 1969
Firestone Country Club North Course, Akron, Ohio, 1969
Firestone Country Club South Course, Akron, Ohio, 1960
Firestone-South, Akron, Ohio, 1969 
Gordon Lakes Golf Club, Fort Gordon, Georgia 1976
Greenville Country Club-Chanticleer Course, Greenville, SC, 1970
Griffith E. Harris Golf Course, Greenwich, Connecticut, 1963
Hancock Golf Course, Hancock NY, 1941
Hazeltine National Golf Club, Chaska, Minnesota, 1962
Hominy Hill Golf Course, Colts Neck, New Jersey, 1964 
Kananaskis Country Golf Course, Kananaskis, Alberta, Canada 1983
Luisita Golf and Country Club, Tarlac City, Philippines 
Las Brisas Golf Club, Marbella, Spain 1968
Lyman Meadow Golf Course, Middlefield, Connecticut 1969
Madeline Island Golf Club, La Pointe, Wisconsin 1967
Marshes Golf Club, Ottawa, Ontario, Canada
Masterpiece at Treetops Resort, Gaylord, Michigan, 1987
Metedeconk National Golf Club, Jackson, New Jersey, 1987
MetroWest Golf Club, Orlando, Florida, 1987
Midvale Country Club, Penfield, New York, 1931
Mission Viejo Country Club, Mission Viejo, California, 1967
Montauk Downs, Montauk, New York, 1968
North Hills Country Club, Manhasset, New York, 1963 
Old Warson Country Club, St. Louis, Missouri, 1955
Olympic Club Lake Course, San Francisco, California, 1954
Oak Hill-East, Rochester, New York, 1955, 1967
Panther Valley Country Club, Allamuchy, New Jersey
Pauma Valley Country Club, Pauma Valley, CA, 1961
Peachtree, 1949
Point O'Woods Golf & Country Club, Benton Harbor, Michigan, 1958
Port Royal Golf Course, Southampton, Bermuda, 1970
Portsmouth Country Club, Portsmouth, NH, 1957
Pottawatomie Golf Course, St Charles, IL, 1939
Quinta da Marinha Golf Resorts, Cascais, Portugal, 1984
Punta Borinquen Golf Club, Aguadilla, Puerto Rico, 1940
Rancocas Golf Club, Willingboro, New Jersey, 1966
Real Club de Golf de Sotogrande, Cadiz, Spain, 1964
River Shore Estates & Golf Links, Kamloops, British Columbia, Canada
Robert Trent Jones Golf Club, Gainesville, Virginia, 1991
Robert Trent Jones Golf Course, Cornell University, Ithaca, New York 1940
Robert Trent Jones Golf Trail, Alabama, 1992-2005
Royal Bercuit Golf Club, Grez-Doiceau, Belgium, 1967
Seven Oaks Golf Course, Hamilton, NY, 1965
Shady Oaks Country Club, Fort Worth, Texas, 1958
Southern Highlands Golf Club, Las Vegas, Nevada, 1999
Speidel Golf Club-Jones Course, Wheeling, W.V. 
Spyglass Hill, Pebble Beach, California, 1966
St George's Golf Course, St George's, Bermuda
The Greens at North Hills, Sherwood, Arkansas 
The Golf Course at Half Moon, Jamaica, W.I., 1962
The Legends Country Club, Eureka, MO
The Springs Golf Course, Spring Green, Wisconsin
The Wigwam Resort Gold Course, Litchfield Park, Arizona, 1965 
West Point Golf Course, West Point, New York, 1946 
Valderrama Golf Club, Cadiz, Spain, 1974
Vidauban Golf Club(Le Prince de Provence), France, 1999
 Turtle Point Yacht and Country Club, Killen, Alabama. 1961
Valley View Golf Course, Utica, NY, 1939
Yellowstone Country Club, Billings, MT, 1957/1958

References

Golf courses designed by Robert Trent Jones
Jones